Upper Orakzai Tehsil is a subdivision located in Orakzai District, Khyber Pakhtunkhwa, Pakistan. The population is 63,872 according to the 2017 census.

See also 
 List of tehsils of Khyber Pakhtunkhwa

References 

Tehsils of Khyber Pakhtunkhwa
Populated places in Orakzai District